Karaman Province is a province of south-central Turkey. A 2010 estimate puts the population at 232,633 people. According to the 2000 census, the population was 243,210. The population density is 27.54 people/km. The traffic code is 70. The capital is the city of Karaman. Karaman was the location of the Karamanid Beylik, which came to an end in 1486.

Districts and Towns

Karaman Province is divided into 6 districts: Ayrancı, Başyayla, Ermenek, Kazımkarabekir, Sarıveliler, and the capital, Karaman.

Towns include Yeşildere, Sudurağı, Akçaşehir, and Taşkale.

Place of interest

Churches
 Çeşmeli Kilise (Surp Asvadzadzin Ermeni Kilisesi)
 Fisandon Church
 Binbir Church

See also
 Görmeli, a village on the hillside of the Taurus Mountains near Ermenek
 Mount Karadağ, an extinct volcano north of Karaman city
 List of populated places in Karaman Province

Gallery

References

External links

  Karaman governor's official website
 Political map of Karaman province
  Karaman municipality's official website
  Karaman weather forecast information

See also 
 Karaman Eyalet